DCLP may refer to:

Digital Corpus of Literary Papyri
Double-checked locking pattern